is a former Japanese football player.

Playing career
Goto was born in Yamagata Prefecture on August 9, 1971. After graduating from Nihon University, he joined Japan Football League club Kyoto Purple Sanga in 1994. He played many matches as offensive midfielder in 1995 and the club was promoted to the J1 League in 1996. In 1996, he played as substitute against Verdy Kawasaki in opening matches in the 1996 season. However he did not play in any matches after his debut and retired at the end of the 1996 season.

Club statistics

References

External links

kyotosangadc

1971 births
Living people
Nihon University alumni
Association football people from Yamagata Prefecture
Japanese footballers
J1 League players
Japan Football League (1992–1998) players
Kyoto Sanga FC players
Association football midfielders